Gans is a Dutch and German noun meaning "goose".

It is also a surname. Notable people with the surname include:

Bird Stein Gans (1868–1944), American educator involved in parent education
Bruce Gans, American physiatrist
Carl Gans (1923–2009), Jewish German-American zoologist and herpetologist
Christophe Gans (born 1960), French film director
Curtis Gans (1937–2015), American political activist and voting expert
Danny Gans (1956–2009), American singer and comedian
David Gans (1541–1613), Jewish German-Czech mathematician, historian and astronomer
David Gans (musician) (born 1953), American musician, songwriter and music journalist
Donovan Gans (born 1971), American football player
Eduard Gans (1797–1839), Jewish German jurist
Eric Gans (born 1941), American literary scholar and professor
Herbert J. Gans (born 1927), American sociologist
Joachim Gans, 16th-century Jewish Czech mining expert, the first Jew to live in North America
Joe Gans (1874–1910), American lightweight boxer
José Moreno Gans (1897–1976), Spanish composer
Joshua Gans, Australian economist
Judy Gans (1886–1949), American baseball player
Julius J. Gans (1896–1973), American lawyer, politician, and judge
Lothar Gans (born 1953), German association football player
Ludwig Aaron Gans (1794–1871), German industrialist
Mitchell Gans, American legal scholar
Óscar Gans (1903–1965), Cuban attorney and politician
Panama Joe Gans (1896–1983), Barbadian middleweight boxer
Paula Gans (1883–1941), Czech painter
Peter Gans (born 1937), Dutch association football referee
Richard Gans, founder of the Spanish type foundry Fundiciòn Richard Gans
Richard Gans (1880–1954), Jewish German physicist
Ron Gans (1931–2010), American voice-over artist and character actor
Sharon Gans (born 1942), American actress
Solomon Philip Gans (1788–1843), German jurist
Stedman Gans (born 1997), South African rugby sevens player

Gansz
Frank Gansz (1938–2009), American football coach
Gansz Trophy

See also
Ganz (disambiguation)
Gantz (disambiguation)
Gan (surname)

cs:Gans
de:Gans (Begriffsklärung)
fr:Gans (homonymie)
nl:Gans
pt:Gans
sv:Gans
vo:Gans
Occupational surnames
Surnames from nicknames